Erik Anderson is an American former ice hockey center who was an All-American for St. Lawrence.

Career
Anderson saw a great deal of success in his junior hockey career. His first year with the Stratford Cullitons saw him win both the league championship as well as the Sutherland Cup. The team repeated as MWJHL champions in 1996 and, while they were stopped just shy of a three-peat, Anderson personally had a superb final season. In 1997 he led the league in all three statistical categories, averaging more than 3 points per game for the year. He took his considerable scoring prowess to St. Lawrence but his freshman year was anything but spectacular. The decline was only temporary, however, and he more than doubled his point production as a sophomore, helping turn the Larries into one of the top teams in ECAC Hockey and getting them into the NCAA Tournament for the first time in seven years. Entering his junior season, Anderson was named an alternate captain and continued his scoring pace. This time, the team captured both conference championships and reached the Frozen Four for the first time in twelve years (the program's last appearance as of 2021). He was named team captain as a senior and, while the team declined a bit, Anderson had his best season yet, being named an All-American and ECAC Player of the Year.

After graduating, Anderson began playing professionally and started with the Milwaukee Admirals. He had some difficulty in adjusting to the AHL, averaging just over 1 point every 5 games, and found himself demoted to the ECHL before season's end. His second year began with him as a member of the Toledo Storm but he got off to a tremendous start. After six games, he had scored 10 points, was the team's leading scorer, and was recalled to the Milwaukee Admirals. While his scoring improved in year two, it still wasn't enough for the Admirals to keep him on the roster and he was eventually returned to Toledo.

Rather than continue in the minors, Anderson headed to England and joined the Sheffield Steelers. He finished second on the club in scoring and helped them win the inaugural EIHL championship, being named a second-team all-star for the year. After reaching the semifinals the next year, Anderson left the team and split the following year with two clubs in central Europe before returning across the pond and ending his playing career with the Elmira Jackals.

Anderson was inducted into the St. Lawrence Athletic Hall of Fame in 2019.

Statistics

Regular season and playoffs

Awards and honors

References

External links

1978 births
Living people
AHCA Division I men's ice hockey All-Americans
American men's ice hockey centers
Cincinnati Cyclones players
Elmira Jackals (UHL) players
EHC Freiburg players
Herlev Hornets players
Ice hockey people from Michigan
Milwaukee Admirals players
People from Plymouth, Michigan
Sheffield Steelers players
St. Lawrence Saints men's ice hockey players
Toledo Storm players